Awni Abd al-Hadi, aka  Auni Bey Abdel Hadi (1889, Nablus, Ottoman Empire – 15 March 1970, Cairo, Egypt) was a Palestinian political figure. He was educated in Beirut, Istanbul, and at the Sorbonne University in Paris. His wife was Tarab Abd al-Hadi, a Palestinian activist and feminist.

Political activity
In 1911 Abd al-Hadi, along with Rafiq al-Tamimi were founding members of the Paris-based underground al-Fatat ("the Young Arab Society") nationalist society, which was devoted to Arab independence and unity. He was among the organizers of the Arab Congress of 1913 in Paris. When Faisal I of Iraq arrived in Paris en route to London in December 1918 Ahmad Qadri located Abd al-Hadi  introduced him to Faisal who appointed him as the head of the administrative office for the Arab delegation to the Paris Peace Conference, 1919.
Abd al-Hadi was later an adviser to Amir Abdullah in Transjordan.

On his return to Palestine in 1924, Abd al-Hadi became one of the chief spokesmen of the Palestinian Arab nationalist movement and was elected representative to the 5th (August 1922, Nablus) and 6th (June 1923, Jaffa) Congress of the Arab Executive Committee for Jenin and to the 7th (June 1928) for Beisan. He was secretary of the Executive Committee's Congress in 1928.

In 1930 Abd al-Hadi was a member of the Palestinian Arab delegation to the United Kingdom and a lawyer for the Supreme Muslim Council. In August, 1932 he was a founder, general secretary and first elected president of the Palestinian Istiqlal (Independence) Party, the first regularly constituted Palestinian Arab political party. He was also the party's representative on the Arab Higher Committee, formed in April 1936, for which he served as general secretary. Abd al-Hadi was a moderate who was prepared to negotiate with members of the Yishuv.

Abd al-Hadi held some responsibility for the Arab revolt of 1936–39. The Istiqlal Party was banned and he, who was out of the territory at the time, was banned from re-entry to Palestine. The British administration also deported three committee members and two other political leaders in 1937 (until 1941). He was a member of the Palestinian delegation to the London Conference in February 1939.

After the 1948 Arab-Israeli war, Awni Abd al-Hadi ended up in Cairo, Egypt with his wife, Tarab Abdul Hadi. In 1948, Abd al-Hadi was a member and appointed Minister for Social Affairs of the Egyptian-sponsored All-Palestine Government headed by Amin al-Husayni. From 1951 to 1955, he was Jordan's minister and later ambassador to Cairo. From 1955 to 1958, he was a Jordanian senator and from 1958 chairman of the Arab League's Legal committee in Cairo.

Abd al-Hadi died on 15 March 1970 in Cairo.

Notes

References

External links
Auni Bey Abdul Hadi closing argument for the  1930 Western Wall Commission (also called The Lofgren Commission)
Auni Bey Abdul Hadi public testimony for the  Peel Commission (1936)

1889 births
1970 deaths
People from Nablus
Arab people in Mandatory Palestine
Independence Party (Mandatory Palestine) politicians
University of Paris alumni
Members of the Senate of Jordan
Palestinian diplomats
Ambassadors of Jordan to Egypt
Palestinian refugees
Palestinian Arab nationalists
Members of the All-Palestine Government
Ottoman expatriates in France